The Czech Paralympic team are the athletes and their support teams, who represent or represented the Czech Republic at the Paralympic Games. It also includes a team of many people who have to coordinate security, and work on the preparation and realization of all Czech Paralympic activities.

The Czech Paralympic Committee (CPC) is the body whose main function is to develop ideas of Paralympism in the Czech Republic and is responsible for preparing and supplying stately representation for the Czech Republic at the Summer or Winter Paralympic Games.

The mascot for the Czech Paralympic team is a bird named "Emil".

Summer Paralympic Games

Winter Paralympic Games

See also
 Czech Republic at the Olympics

References